The 1895 international cricket season was from April 1895 to September 1895. The season comprised two minor tours to Netherlands by Ivanhoe Cricket Club of Australia and Worcestershire Gentlemen of England.

Season overview

References

International cricket competitions by season
1895 in cricket